The Franklin City School District is located in Franklin, Ohio.

The District has approximately 3500 students

Schools in District
Franklin High School - Grades 9-12
Franklin Junior High School - Grades 7-8
Anthony Wayne Elementary School - Grades 1-6
Gerke Elementary School - Grades 1-6
Schneck Elementary School - Grades 1-6
Pennyroyal Elementary School - Grades 1-6
Hunter Elementary School - Grades 1-6
Early Childhood Center (Hampton Bennett Building) - Grades Pre K - Kindergarten

References

External links
Official school district website
Warren County School District Map

School districts in Ohio
Education in Warren County, Ohio